Mucurici is the northernmost municipality in the Brazilian state of Espírito Santo. Its population was 5,496 (2020) and its area is 537.711 km².

References

Municipalities in Espírito Santo
Populated places established in 1953